Charles E. Springer (February 20, 1928 – February 19, 2019) was a justice of the Supreme Court of Nevada from 1981 to 1997. a two-time candidate for Governor of Nevada, Springer also served as the state's attorney general. Since 2007, Springer has worked at the law firm Kermitt Waters.

Early life and education
Springer graduated from the University of Nevada, Reno in 1950 and received his law degree from Georgetown University in 1953.

Springer worked for the Nevada Legislature in 1954 and later that year ran unsuccessfully for Reno city attorney. He later became Gabbs city attorney. In 1955, he started his own law practice. Springer was active in the state Democratic Party, serving as state party chair and a Democratic national committeeman.

Career
Springer was appointed Attorney General in 1962 by Governor Grant Sawyer, but then challenged Sawyer in the 1966 Democratic party primary. He later ran as an independent  for Governor again in 1970. In 1973, he became the Juvenile Court master in Washoe County.

In 1974, he challenged Justice Gordon Thompson for a seat on the Supreme Court and lost. He ran again in 1980, beating District Judge Paul Goldman and was reelected unopposed in 1986 and 1992.

References

1928 births
2019 deaths
Justices of the Nevada Supreme Court
Nevada Attorneys General
20th-century American judges
Chief Justices of the Nevada Supreme Court
University of Nevada, Reno alumni
Georgetown University Law Center alumni